Toy Soldiers: War Chest is an  action/strategy video game developed by Signal Studios and published by Ubisoft. The game was released on August 11, 2015, for Microsoft Windows, PlayStation 4 and Xbox One.

War Chest is the first title in the series not to be a Microsoft console exclusive.

Gameplay 
Toy Soldiers: War Chest is similar to the previous games where players prevent enemy units from reaching the toybox by building and upgrading turrets. In War Chest, turrets can be improved by upgrading armor, fire rate and damage separately. The enemy AI is improved as well. For example, destroying a bridge will cause ground units to take a different path to the toybox. Certain units have the ability to heal nearby units and some will focus on destroying any placed turrets.

Barrages and playable units from Toy Soldiers: Cold War return with a few changes. Instead of earning killstreaks or destroying a specially marked enemy unit, the game uses a bar that fills up when killing enemy units. When the bar is filled to a certain amount, a special ability can used to call in barrages or spawn a hero unit such as a zeppelin that performs a bombing run.

The game features 4 highly customizable armies (8 in Hall of Fame Edition). Players can choose which turrets to deploy, barrages and modify the hero's arsenal. As the game progresses, new customization options will become available

Release 
War Chest comes in two versions: Standard and Hall of Fame Edition. The Standard version is digital while the Hall of Fame Edition is available on disc except for the PC version which is all digital. The standard version features four playable armies; in addition to Kaiser from the original game, War Chest includes three new original armies, namely Phantom, StarBright and Dark Lord.

The Hall of Fame Edition features four additional licensed armies based on fictional characters. This includes Duke and Cobra Commander from G.I. Joe, Ezio Auditore da Firenze from Assassin's Creed and He-Man from Masters of the Universe. The characters can be purchased separately or as a bundle on the standard version.

Reception
The game received mixed reviews from critics upon release according to review aggregator Metacritic.

References

External links 
Toy Soldiers: War Chest on Ubisoft

Action video games
PlayStation 4 games
Split-screen multiplayer games
Strategy video games
Tower defense video games
2015 video games
Video games about toys
Video games based on toys
Video games developed in the United States
Windows games
World War I video games
Xbox One games
Ubisoft games